The 2012 German Athletics Championships were held at the Lohrheidestadion in Bochum-Wattenscheid on 16–17 June 2012.

Results

Men

Women

References 
 Results source:

External links 
 Official website of the 2012 German Athletics Championships 

2012
German Athletics Championships
German Athletics Championships
June 2012 sports events in Germany